Ureed (Arabic: أريد, meaning I want in English)  is a web-based platform that links businesses and employers with freelance workers. Its headquarters is located in Dubai, UAE.

History
Ureed was founded in 2017 by Nour Al Hassan. It was operated by Tarjama, a UAE-based company founded in 2008. In 2019, Ureed was recognized as the best startup of the year at the Startup Grind Jordan Awards, organized by ZINC. In March 2019, Tarjama closed a $5m fundraising from two investors, Wamda Capital and Anova Investments as a part of an expansion plan for Ureed.

In June 2020, Ureed received a seed investment of over $1m from Wamda Capital and Anova Investments but the parties have not announced the size of the deal.
The same month, Ureed announced it has spun out to become its own company led by CEO Marwan Abdelaziz, and announced its acquisition of Nabbesh, a freelance marketplace which was founded in 2012. Nabbesh's acquisition resulted in an integration of all Nabbesh's assets including the contracts and freelancers into Ureed. As a part of the expansion, Ureed developed from a linguistic content-focused platform to a general freelance marketplace offering more categories and fields.

In December 2020, Ureed reported 54000 users compared to 20,000 subscribers at the beginning of 2020.

See also
 Upwork
 Fiverr
 Guru.com
 PeoplePerHour

References

External links
Official Website
WorkOpp Website

Business services companies established in 2017
Freelance marketplace websites
2017 establishments in the United Arab Emirates